The following is a list of players, both past and current, who appeared at least in one game for the Taipei Fubon Braves (2014–present), Taiwan Mobile (2007–2013), Videoland Hunters (2004–2007), or Mars (1993–1999, 2003–2004) franchise.



Players

A

B

C

D

E

F

G

H

J

K

L

M

N

O

P

R

S

T

W

Y

Z

References

P. League+ all-time rosters